Frederick Robert Crowder (20 April 1798 – 26 March 1894) was an English amateur cricketer who played first-class cricket from 1817 to 1820.

Frederick Robert Crowder was educated at Eton College and Trinity College, Cambridge. He was mainly associated with  Cambridge University Cricket Club but also played for the Old Etonians in 1817.  He made 3 known appearances in first-class matches.

References

1798 births
1894 deaths
English cricketers
English cricketers of 1787 to 1825
Cambridge University cricketers
Old Etonians cricketers
People educated at Eton College
Alumni of Trinity College, Cambridge